Newman Arena is a 4,473-seat multi-purpose arena at Cornell University in Ithaca, New York, located in Bartels Hall, which is adjacent to Lynah Rink. It is home to the Cornell Big Red basketball and volleyball teams. Its also holds the home of Cornell wrestling for larger events.  It opened in January 1990, replacing Barton Hall, which was remodeled to become a full-time indoor track venue.  It was named for the late Floyd R. Newman, Class of 1912, a major benefactor to the university.

See also
 List of NCAA Division I basketball arenas

References

External links 
Newman Arena

College basketball venues in the United States
Sports venues in New York (state)
Cornell Big Red sports venues
1990 establishments in New York (state)
Sports venues completed in 1990
College volleyball venues in the United States
College wrestling venues in the United States
Basketball venues in New York (state)
Gymnastics venues in New York (state)
Volleyball venues in New York (state)
Wrestling venues in New York (state)